Tumair Sharif (in Urdu تمير شریف)  is valley town and Union Council (UC) situated in the Islamabad Capital Territory of Pakistan. "Tumair Shareef, Islamabad is an Islamic spiritual center and engaged in propagating the spiritual teaching of Islam.Center of Islamic Spirituality Darbar e Aliya Tumair Sharif was established by Sultan ul Arfeen Hazrat Sain Muhammad Ashraf Badshah Sarkar Rehmatullah Alehe." From Darbar e Aliya Tumair Sharif thousands of people getting beneficence of spirituality and changing their behavior positively through teachings given them e.g. love, Peace, prosperity, respect others, community justice, unity & welfare, as well as eliminating all types of conflicts among the social groups. On daily, weekly and monthly basis, thousands of people visits Darbar e Aliya Qadria Qalandaria Tumair Shareef from all the provinces of Pakistan and around the world.

Introduction 
Tumair Sharif  geographical coordinates are 33° 41' 0" North, 73° 16' 0" East.  Tumair sharif is situated 19 km east of the center of Islamabad. Union council Tumair consists of Tumair sharif (capital), Kijnah, New Simli, Barha Mohra, pehont, Darkala, Rakh Tumair A, Rakh Tumair B, Dakhian.  Area wise, Tumair is one of the largest UCs of Islamabad. The town is located in Zone-IV of the capital city, the zone is the largest in term of its area and is mainly designed for farm houses. The main income source is property dealing, farming and jobs.

General Description 
The town is home to a number of  tribes like Dhanyal, Jut, Hashmi, Rajput etc. Dhanyal tribe makes up the majority of the population. Dhanial has been categorized as principal tribes of the district.

Simly dam, the main source of water supply to the capital city Islamabad, is situated in the east of Tumair.  The town lies on the Swan/Soan river, which flows through the  Pathwar/Pothohar region. Soan rises just below Murree and runs for the first 10 miles of its courses nearly due south at a steep gradient down picturesque valleys till it reaches the plains Cherah.

References 

Union councils of Islamabad Capital Territory